The following page lists the power stations in Georgia.

Thermal

Hydroelectric

Wind

References

See also 

 Energy in Georgia (country)
 List of largest power stations in the world
 List of power stations in Asia
 List of power stations in Europe

Georgia
 
Power stations